Helen Day Stevenson Meyner (March 5, 1928 — November 2, 1997) was an American politician from New Jersey. A Democrat, Meyner served as a U.S. Representative from New Jersey from 1975 to 1979. As the wife of New Jersey Governor Robert B. Meyner, she was First Lady of New Jersey from 1957 to 1962. Meyner also served as a Red Cross nurse in Korea during the Korean War.

Early life and early career
Helen Stevenson was born in New York City to William E. and Eleanor B. Stevenson. Her parents were prominent Democrats. William E. Stevenson was a founder of a law firm that later became Debevoise & Plimpton. He also served as president of Oberlin College and as Ambassador to the Philippines. They were members of the Stevenson family, which included Illinois governor and two-time Democratic nominee for president Adlai Stevenson II.

Helen Stevenson graduated from Rosemary Hall (now part of Choate Rosemary Hall) in 1946 and from Colorado College with a Bachelor of Arts degree in history in 1950.

American Red Cross 
Stevenson was a field worker for the Red Cross in Korea from 1950 to 1952. Her time as an American Red Cross (A.R.C.) nurse and Clubmobile worker is well documented in her own personal letters. In these letters she writes to her family about her time in Japan and Korea during the Korean War, giving a personal account of her duties and experiences working abroad in wartime. Meyner's letters from her time serving in the A.R.C. can be found in the Meyner Papers, located in Skillman Library at Lafayette College.

Letters 
Meyner's serving papers take the form of either letters or postcards written to her family during her time in the Korean War. These documents describe her experiences as a hospital nurse in Japan from 1950 to 1951 and a clubmobile worker in Pusan, Korea from 1951 to 1952. Throughout her time at the A.R.C., Meyner continuously expressed her discontent with the administration and the mistreatment of the volunteers.

During her time in Japan, Meyner worked as a nurse in an American military hospital. As the hospital was severely understaffed and under-equipped, soldiers did not receive the health care that they needed, especially with regard to their mental well-being. Through her patients, Meyner learned of the chaos in Korea. She emphasized that the western media coverage of the war was not reflecting the actual situation.

In April 1951, Meyner arrived in Pusan, Korea, as a clubmobile. She served coffee and doughnuts to soldiers who were returning to the base. She describes Korea as “dirty” and “extremely impoverished” in comparison to Japan.

Although her work was in recreational services, she was able to collect information about the war from soldiers. Meyner specifically reflected on her role as a white woman; often, soldiers enjoyed her company due to the lack of American women serving in Korea.

She indicates that the troops included soldiers from many nations. However, the hierarchy within the military prioritized white American soldiers over other nationalities.

{{bquote|“... I must say that the foreign troops are ever so much more polite...than our own G.I’s. American soldiers are treated better than any soldiers in the world” (April 30th, 1951).}}

In February 2019, Kara Dixon Vuic wrote the book The Girls Next Door: Bringing the Home Front to the Front Lines'', which pulled from Helen Stevenson Meyner's letters as well as other women's writings in similar lines of wartime work to explore gender roles in the war environment. Vuic highlighted Meyner in the chapter “Dancing for Democracy.”

Images 
Images of Meyner from this time period are accessible in the online exhibit “Coffee, Doughnuts, and a Witty Line of Chatter”.

First Lady of New Jersey
Stevenson married Robert B. Meyner, then governor of New Jersey, on January 19, 1957 in Oberlin, Ohio. Helen Stevenson Meyner served as first lady of New Jersey. Robert Meyner left office as governor in 1962 due to term limits.

U.S. House of Representatives
In 1972, Meyner ran as the Democratic nominee for Representative from New Jersey's newly redistricted 13th Congressional District that included her home in Phillipsburg and included Hunterdon, Sussex and Warren Counties and portions of Mercer and Morris Counties. She lost in the Republican-leaning district to the Republican candidate, Joseph J. Maraziti.

In 1974, with the Watergate scandal leading to Democratic congressional gains throughout the country, Meyner ran for the seat again, this time beating Maraziti.  She won a second term in the 1976 elections in a close race against William E. Schluter, but lost her bid for a third term in 1978 to Republican James A. Courter. Meyner was known as a liberal Democrat.

In 1979, the Supersisters trading card set was produced and distributed; one of the cards featured Meyner's name and picture.

Death
Meyner died on November 2, 1997, in Fort Myers, Florida.

See also 
 Women in the United States House of Representatives

References

Sources 
 
 Boyd, Ruby, Rachel Mead, and Sarah Ulstrup. "“We Cannot Change the World but We Can Change the People in It.” The Eleanor Bumstead Stevenson Papers." Digitizing American Feminisms. Accessed April 15, 2019. “We cannot change the world but we can change the people in it.” The Eleanor Bumstead Stevenson Papers – Digitizing American Feminisms.
 Stevenson, Eleanor. I Knew Your Soldier: An Intimate Picture of Our Boys Overseas. Penguin Books, 1945.
 "The Robert B. and Helen Stevenson Meyner Papers, 1910-1998." Lafayette College Special Collections & College Archives. August 16, 2000. Accessed April 15, 2019. The Robert B. and Helen Stevenson Meyner Papers
 "WILLIAM E. AND ELEANOR B. STEVENSON PAPERS 15 INVENTORY." Oberlin College Archives. Accessed April 15, 2019. .

1929 births
1997 deaths
Colorado College alumni
Democratic Party members of the United States House of Representatives from New Jersey
Female members of the United States House of Representatives
First Ladies and Gentlemen of New Jersey
People from Phillipsburg, New Jersey
Women in New Jersey politics
20th-century American politicians
20th-century American women politicians